This is a list of sports venues in Lahore, Punjab, Pakistan.

Cricket

International Stadium 
Gaddafi Stadium
Bagh-e-Jinnah Cricket Ground

Domestic/First Class Cricket Grounds 

Punjab University Cricket Ground
Muhammadan Anglo Oriental College Cricket Ground
Government College University Cricket Ground
Lahore University of Management Sciences Cricket Ground
Lahore Gymkhana Cricket Ground
DHA Phase I Cricket Ground
PCSIR Cricket Ground
Model Town Cricket Club Ground
Valencia Town Cricket Ground
Abdul Razzaq Stadium and Cricket Ground
Lahore Cricket Academy (Lahore Country Club)
PGECHS Cricket Ground
Township Cricket Ground
Acoba Cricket Ground
Technical Training Institute Cricket Ground and Club
Ghalib Market Cricket Ground
Lahore City Cricket Association Ground
Muslim High School Cricket Ground (Dhaka Road)
MET Cricket Ground (Singhpura Stop)
Mian Nawaz Sharif Cricket Complex, Kashmir Crown Gymkhana Cricket Club, Shahdara
UET Stadium

Private/Company Cricket Grounds 
Bedian Spins Cricket Ground
Oasis Golf and Aqua Resort

Football
 Oval grounds, Allama Iqbal Medical College, Lahore
Punjab University Football Ground
Aitchison College Football Field
Askari X Soccer Field
Garrison Degree Science College Football Ground
Lahore University of Management Sciences Football Ground
Lahore Gymkhana Football Ground
Lahore Country & Sports Club Football Ground
Model Town C-Block Ground
Valencia Town Football Ground
Sarfaraz Siddique Road Football Ground
Football Stadium (Gaddafi Road)
Patiala Ground (KEMU).
Crescent Model Higher Secondary School, Football Ground, Shadman, Lahore
UET Football Ground
Model Town Football Club (MTFC)

Hockey

National Hockey Stadium
Johar Town Hockey Stadium
Afghan Park Hockey Ground, Lahore (Afghan Hockey Club)
DHA Phase 5 Hockey Field
Nobel Hockey Club
University of Engineering & Technology Hockey Ground
 Quaid-e-Azam Hockey Club Township Lahore
Hockey Ground (Sarwar Road)
Youngster Hockey Club Lahore

Golf
Royal Palm Golf and Country Club
Lahore Gymkhana Golf Course
Garrison Golf and Country Club
Alfalah Mini Golf
Defence Raya Golf & Country Club
Bahria Town Mini Golf Course
Holiday Inn Golf Course
Model Town Golf Club (formerly known as Nawaz Sharif Park)
Lake City, Lahore Golf Course
Oasis Golf and Aqua Resort

Squash
Government College University Lahore Squash and Gym
University of Engineering & Technology Squash and Gym
Lahore University of Management Sciences Squash Courts
Punjab University Squash Courts
Samanabad Sports Complex
Punjab Squash Federation
Services Institute of Medical Sciences Squash Courts
Squash Complex (Lower Mall Road)
Moono Squash Complex (near Aitchison College)
King Edward Medical University, Lahore
Tech Society, Main Canal Road, Lahore
 Shapes, Lahore

Rugby

Lahore Rugby Football Club
Lahore University of Management Sciences Rugby Football Club

Polo

Lahore Garrison Polo Club

 Fortress Stadium (Lahore)

Lahore Polo Club (Golf Lane)
Polo Ground (Sarwar Road)
Lahore Polo & Country Club , Phase VIII, DHA, Lahore

Swimming Pools
Township Ladies park
Punjab University Swimming Pool
DHA Swimming Pools
Samanabad Sports Complex
King Edward's Medical University, Lahore
Model Town Club Swimming pool
University of Engineering & Technology
University of Central Punjab
Iqbal Park (Minar-e-Pakistan) Swimming pool 
Shapes, Lahore
Defence Club Swimming Pool
R Block DHA Community Club Swimming Pool
WAPDA Sports Complex, Ferozpur Road Lahore
Punjab International Swimming Complex, Qaddafi Stadium, Lahore

Skating
National Bank Park
Silver Star
 Gulshan Park lahore Iqbal town

See also
 List of stadiums in Pakistan
 List of cricket grounds in Pakistan
 List of sports venues in Karachi
 List of sports venues in Faisalabad
 List of parks and gardens in Lahore
 List of tallest buildings in Lahore

 
Sports venues
Lahore
Lahore